Philip James Adams  (born 5 February 1991) is an Australian former cricketer who played at List A level for Western Australia. Adams was born in Midland, Western Australia, and attended John Forrest Senior High School's cricket academy. He played cricket for Western Australia at both under-17s and under-19s level, scoring 228 runs from seven matches at an average of 32.57 in the 2007–08 Under-17 Championship Series, and 343 runs from seven matches at an average of 85.75, with a highest score of 171, at the 2009–10 Australian Under-19 Championships. He was selected in the Team of the Championships for the under-19 championships, and nominated in the provisional 30-man squad for the 2010 Under-19 World Cup. Adams made his Futures League debut for the Western Australia Under-23s team against Queensland Under-23s during the 2009–10 season, scoring 117* on debut. He went on to make his limited-overs debut for Western Australia against South Australia in the 2010–11 Ryobi One-Day Cup, scoring five runs batting seventh. Adams played one further match at state level, against Tasmania, and was again dismissed for five runs, having opened the innings with Marcus Harris. At grade cricket leve, he plays for Bayswater–Morley.

References

External links

1991 births
Australian cricketers
Living people
Cricketers from Perth, Western Australia
Western Australia cricketers
Sportsmen from Western Australia